Conraua beccarii is a species of frog in the family Conrauidae found in Eritrea and Ethiopia. Its natural habitats are subtropical or tropical moist montane forest, subtropical or tropical dry lowland grassland, subtropical or tropical high-altitude grassland, rivers, and freshwater marshes. It is threatened by habitat loss.

References

Conraua
Amphibians of Ethiopia
Vertebrates of Eritrea
Taxonomy articles created by Polbot
Amphibians described in 1911